Delta Sigma Epsilon was a national collegiate social sorority founded at Miami University, operating in the United States from 1914 to 1956. It was originally a member of the Association of Education Sororities (AES) before the AES's merger with the National Panhellenic Conference, and most of its chapters were located at teaching colleges. The sorority was absorbed by Delta Zeta sorority on August 21, 1956.

History
Delta Sigma Epsilon was organized at Miami University in Oxford, Ohio, on September 23, 1914. Dean Harvey C. Minnich, of the College of Education, selected several young students to form this organization. He selected them based on their academic records and character. These seven ladies were:
 Marie Cropper
 Ruth Gabler
 Josephine McIntire
 Virginia Stark
 Charlotte Stark
 Opal Warning
 Louise Wolfe.

Throughout the next few decades, the sorority added chapters and joined an umbrella organization. In 1917, the fifth chapter, Epsilon, was installed. The sorority was now admitted into the Association of Pedagogical Sororities. "From that date Delta Sigma Epsilon played a leading role in determining and perfecting the policies of that national association, later renamed Association of Education Sororities." Local chapters absorbed included the Zeta chapter of Arethusa/Sigma Gamma Phi at the State Normal and Training School (currently SUNY Buffalo State College) in 1926. In 1941, Pi Delta Theta, a fellow associate sorority, merged with Delta Sigma Epsilon. This was the first and only merger within the Association of Education Sororities (AES).

In 1947, the National Panhellenic Conference (NPC) granted membership to the six remaining members of the AES. The AES disbanded.  was now part of the NPC.

By 1949,  had installed 46 chapters in "leading colleges throughout the United States."

Several members of the  Grand Council held position on their new sorority's grand council.

By the time of the merger, Delta Sigma Epsilon had installed a total of 54 chapters, of which 43 groups were active at the time of the merger.  Deleting duplications, 34 chapters either became new Delta Zeta chapters or merged into existing chapters on their campuses, making this the largest merger in Panhellenic history.  A few chapters were released to join other national groups: Tau chapter at Kent State would eventually join Alpha Chi Omega, Alpha Delta chapter at Southern Illinois eventually joined Alpha Gamma Delta, and the Beta Gamma chapter at Marquette University would eventually join Alpha Delta Pi.

Creed
I believe in Delta Sigma Epsilon and her power to develop character, scholarship, and leadership. I believe in the highest standards of womanhood which she maintains and the close friendship which she fosters. I believe in her power to give direction to the thoughts and lives of those women who are so fortunate as to be affiliated with her.As noted in The Manual of Delta Sigma Epsilon, printed in the 1949 issue of The Shield.

Symbols
The cornucopia and the friendship circle were the most prominent symbols. The letters Omega and Phi were part of the secret motto. The official colors were olive green and cream. The flower was the cream tea rose.

"The coat of arms consisted of an olive green cream and shield with the mantle around the upper half. Seven stars, in honor of the founders, occupied the band across the shield, while the ring adorned the love green section and the Omega Phi is on the lower portion. Above the shield is the cornucopia. At the base a furled ribbon shows the inscription of Delta Sigma Epsilon in Greek letters."

"The official seal was affixed to national charters and to all legal documents. It was a circle within a circle. Between the circles is the open motto of the fraternity. In the inner circle is a seven-pointed shield bearing the Greek letters , the friendship circle, and the cornucopia."

Pins
According to Florence Hood Miner's descriptions from her 1983 book, Delta Sigma Epsilon had the following pins and badges:

 Membership pin: "The official plain or pearl badge was a gold pin, shield shaped, having seven points, the edge being of pearls or of gold. , the friendship circle, the cornucopia, and the secret motto in gold on a black background."
 Pledge pin: "...a small silver cornucopia bearing the letters "
 Mothers pin: "...black enamel and shaped like a shield. It was set with one ruby and bore the letters ΔΣΕ across the center"
 Recognition pin: "a small gold cornucopia bearing the letters "
 Grand Council badge: " a gold circle set with diamond circumscribing the official pin. The gold circle denoted eternal friendship and the diamonds denoted the numbers of terms of service on the Council, the maximum number limited to seven in honor of the founders."

Chapters
Delta Sigma Epsilon was a member of the Association of Educational Sororities (AES). Its chapters were traditionally located on the campuses of normal schools or teachers' colleges. Some of its early chapters include:

This list is incomplete.

References

 Baird's Manual of American College Fraternities (multiple volumes)

Defunct former members of the National Panhellenic Conference
Delta Zeta
Miami University
Student organizations established in 1914
1914 establishments in Ohio